This is a list of the major rivers that flow through Slovakia and their lengths.

Alphabetic list (selection)

Ordered by rivers and their tributaries (selection)
ordered against the direction of the river flow; H stands for Hungary
 Danube/Dunaj
 Tisa (mouth at Novi Sad, Serbia)
 Slaná (at Tiszagyulaháza, H)
 Hornád (at Ónod, H)
 Torysa (at Nižná Hutka)
 Hnilec (at Margecany)
 Bodva (at Boldva, H)
 Turňa (near Turňa nad Bodvou)
 Ida (near Turňa nad Bodvou)
 Rimava (at Vlkyňa)
 Turiec (near Tornaľa)
 Muráň (at Bretka)
 Bodrog* (at Tokaj, H) [* the Bodrog arises through the confluence of the rivers Ondava and Latorica]
 Roňava (at Sátoraljaújhely, H)
 Ondava* (at Zemplín (village))
 Topľa (at Tušice)
 Latorica* (at Zemplín)
 Laborec (at Zatín)
 Uzh/Uh (at Drahňov)
 Cirocha (at Humenné)
 Ipeľ (at Szob, H)
 Štiavnica (at Hrkovce)
 Krupinica (at Šahy)
 Krtíš (at Slovenské Ďarmoty)
 Tisovník (at Muľa)
 Hron (at Kamenica nad Hronom)
 Slatina (at Zvolen)
 Bystrica (at Banská Bystrica)
 Váh (at Komárno)
 Nitra (at Komárno)
 Žitava (at Martovce)
 Radosinka (at Lužianky)
 Bebrava (at Práznovce)
 Little Danube/Malý Dunaj (at Kolárovo)
 Čierna Voda (at Veľký Ostrov near Komárno)
 Dudváh (at Čierna Voda)
 Dudváh (at Siladice)
 Kysuca (at Žilina)
 Bystrica (at Krásno nad Kysucou)
 Rajčanka (at Žilina)
 Turiec (at Martin)
 Orava (at Kraľovany)
 Revúca (at Ružomberok)
 Belá (at Liptovský Hrádok)
 Čierny Váh (at Kráľova Lehota)
 Biely Váh (at Kráľova Lehota)
 Morava (in Bratislava (city part Devín))
 Myjava (at Kúty)
 Chvojnica (near Holíč)
 Dunajec
 Poprad (at Nowy Sącz, Poland)

External links
  Rivers and lakes

References

 
Slovakia
Rivers